Seattle Pacific University (SPU) is a private Christian university in Seattle, Washington. It was founded in 1891 in conjunction with the Oregon and Washington Conference of the Free Methodist Church as the Seattle Seminary. It became the Seattle Seminary and College in 1913, adopting the name Seattle Pacific College two years later, and received its current name in 1977.

History
Seattle Pacific University was founded in 1891 by Free Methodist pioneers to train missionaries for overseas service.

On June 5, 2014, a shooting occurred in the Otto Miller Hall, during which one student was killed and two other students were injured. The suspect was not a student at the school and had no connection to the university. The gunman was stopped by student Jon Meis, who used pepper spray to disarm him. Meis received a Citizen Honors award from the Congressional Medal of Honor Society in 2015 for his work in stopping the shooting. On November 16, 2016, the gunman was convicted in the shooting and sentenced to 112 years in prison.

In May 2022, the university's board of trustees voted to keep rules in place that ban LGBTQ people from becoming employees, prompting student protests. The vote by the board of trustees occurred in wake of faculty voting with an 80% majority no-confidence in the board regarding this issue. Washington Attorney General Bob Ferguson announced on July 29 that his office was investigating the university's hiring practices, describing them as potentially illegal and discriminatory. In turn, the university filed a lawsuit against the attorney general, saying that the investigation violates its religious freedom.

On January 26, 2023 it was announced that current Roberts Wesleyan University President Deanna Porterfield would conclude her work in June at the institution in Rochester, NY. She will then move on to assume the role of President at Seattle Pacific University later on in 2023.

Previous names 
As the school developed from a seminary of the Free Methodist Church to its current status as a doctoral degree granting institution, its name has changed over time to befit its changes in status:

1891 – Seattle Seminary
1913 – Seattle Seminary and College
1915 – Seattle Pacific College/Seattle Pacific Christian College
1977 – Seattle Pacific University

Academics

The university's academic programs are divided into one college and five schools:
College of Arts and Sciences
School of Business, Government, and Economics
School of Education
School of Health Sciences
School of Psychology, Family and Community
School of Theology

Honors program
SPU offers a four-year alternate series of general education classes for honors students called University Scholars that revolves around a Great Books reading list and the writing of a lengthy senior dissertation. Along with literature classes, the curriculum includes two Faith & Science classes and a Christianity & Scholarship class. The work load is generally very rigorous.

A student in the program takes his or her sequence of University Scholars courses with the same cohort of 40 students for the entire four years. A student may be admitted to the program regardless of major. There are no University Scholars classes scheduled for the fall of junior year so students have the opportunity to study abroad.

Graduate school
In 2005, SPU launched a MFA low-residency program in Creative Writing featuring distance-learning for graduate writers in Poetry, Fiction, Creative Non-Fiction, and Young Adult Fiction. The program features a site-specific residency on Whidbey Island, WA. Core faculty include several notable authors including Scott Cairns, Lauren Winner, Gina Ochsner, Sara Zarr, and Mischa Willett. The program maintains an institutional affiliation with Image.

Enrollment

Student enrollment
As of the 2018 Autumn Quarter:
Total enrollment: 3,688
Undergraduate students: 2,876
Post-baccalaureate students: 24
Graduate students: 788
Continuing education: 4,297 (2017–2018)

Class size
80 percent of Autumn Quarter 2018 undergraduate classes had enrollments of 30 or less
Student-Faculty Ratio of 13:1 (Based on Common Data Set definition)

Campus

The university sits on a 43-acre campus at the northern end of Queen Anne Hill, near the Fremont neighborhood and approximately four miles north of downtown Seattle. Many of the trees on the campus' central Tiffany Loop are among the oldest in the city. SPU also owns and operates two satellite campuses: a wilderness field station specializing in biology on Blakely Island in the San Juan Islands and Camp Casey, a former U.S. military fort re-purposed as a conference and retreat facility on Whidbey Island. Notable buildings on the Seattle campus include:

Alexander and Adelaide Hall

Named for the first president of Seattle Pacific University, Alexander Beers, this four-story brick building is home to the School of Theology. The founder's first name, Alexander, was used, as the board did not want a building on campus called "Beers Hall." The building also houses the Sociology and History departments within the College of Arts and Sciences. Alexander Hall is the oldest building on campus, and at the time of the university's founding was the campus' only building. A $6.2-million seismic retrofitting and renovation of the interior office space and chapel was completed in 2014. Next door to Alexander is the main performing arts space on campus, the McKinley Theater.

Demaray Hall/Clocktower
Demaray Hall is the central academic building at Seattle Pacific University, housing numerous classrooms as well as the Office of Undergraduate Admissions, Student Academic Services and Student Financial Services. Administrative offices, including the offices of the president and provost, are also located in Demaray.  The building is named for Calvin Dorr Demaray, president of SPU from 1959 to 1968 and pastor of First Free Methodist Church, from 1948 to 1959.

The clocktower in front of Demaray Hall was given to Seattle Pacific University by the class of 1966. It displays a bas-relief sculpture designed by former Professor of Art Ernst Schwidder, titled "Science, Religion and Humanities," which was brought to fruition by former Professor of Art Larry Metcalf and three of his students. The cast-stone relief panels depict various areas of study: the physical sciences, social sciences and humanities. Its symbols are drawn from American Pima, Arabic, Aztec, Babylonian, Egyptian and Greek cultures.

Gwinn Commons

Gwinn Commons is home to three different points of interest. The Crossroads at Gwinn Commons is the main dining hall on campus. Upstairs is the university's main, multi-use location. A pair of large rooms, the Queen Anne Room (named after the neighborhood in which SPU is located) and the Cascade Room (named after the mountain range that can be seen from Upper Gwinn Commons) can each hold up to 500 people. Multiple functions are held in Upper Gwinn, ranging from Group (a Wednesday night worship service), admissions events, lectures, board meetings and more. The President's Dining room is also located here. In addition, there is the Corner Place Market, or C-Store, which holds Einstein Bros. Bagels and also a market where students can purchase various daily necessities. Wells Gwinn, for whom the dining facility is named, served 32 years on the Seattle Pacific Board of Trustees.

Ames Library 

The Ames Library was completed in 1994. Housing over 250,000 volumes and 1,300 print periodicals, it grows by 6,000 new titles a year. Students, faculty, and alumni have access to the collections of Summit and the Orbis Cascade Alliance, comprising over 30 million items held in Washington and Oregon academic libraries, including the University of Washington. In addition to printed reference materials, the library also has access to myriad electronic databases including JSTOR, ProQuest Direct, EBSCOHost, First Search, and others. Access is available to the university community via login both on and off campus.

Peterson Hall

Opened in 1904, Peterson Hall is the second-oldest building on campus and houses the School of Education as well as the Department of Family and Consumer Sciences. In the basement is a food lab, as well as a sewing lab. Each month, SPU's food lab plays host to a Community Kitchen - an outreach to the city's homeless population wherein these individuals join with members of the university community in cooking and sharing a common meal.

Student Union Building
The Student Union Building (commonly known as the "SUB") was built in the 1960s and still serves as a central point where many students gather. On the first floor is the Pacific Collegium, a hub for commuter students. Dining options provided by the on campus dining services can also be found in the SUB. UNICOM, a student-run information desk assists with ticket sales, bus passes, pool passes, among other general information items. ASSP, the student government of SPU has its offices in the SUB along with STUB, the student event programming organization.

Philip W. and Sharon K. Eaton Hall
SPU's main hard sciences facility houses biology, chemistry and some psychology labs. Built in 2003, it is the most advanced building on campus, complete with an electron microscope, cold room, fully contained greenhouse and LEED Certification. This building is central to those students in the Pre-Professional Health Sciences programs. SPU's pre-med track has become widely known for its annual 90–100% acceptance into medical schools following graduation. On May 23, 2012, the SPU Board of Trustees announced that it named the building in honor of past SPU president Philip W.Eaton and his wife, Sharon.

McKenna Hall 

The School of Business, Government, and Economics (SBGE) is located in McKenna Hall. In addition to undergraduate degrees in management, accounting, economics, political science, and global development studies, SBGE also offers three graduate level degrees: Master of Business Administration, Master of Science in Information Management, and a Master of Arts in management. SBGE is home to the Center for Applied Learning and the Center for Integrity in Business which examines the intersections of theology and contemporary business.

Residences
Seattle Pacific University has five residence halls. The university offers other on-campus residence options, such as the Cremona and Wesley apartments, and other small suite- or apartment-style living facilities for continuing students. All residence halls feature single-gender floors. The five residence halls are Ashton Hall, Hill Hall, Moyer Hall, Emerson Hall, and Arnett Hall.

Freshmen are required to live on campus in the residence halls unless they are living with family. Meal plans are required for all students living in the dorms. Students may leave campus housing when they are 20 years old, have junior class status, have petitioned and been approved to live off campus by Campus Housing, or are graduate students.

Arnett Hall welcomed its inaugural residents in Autumn 2014. As SPU's second smallest dorm with only four resident floors, it features suite-style single, double, and triple rooms, a main lounge on the first floor, and a green roof and roof deck on the fifth floor. Rooms on the upper floors may also feature views of the Lake Washington Ship Canal. It is located in the northwest corner of campus, just across the street from Demaray Hall and just down the hill from Gwinn Commons, SPU's dining hall.

Ashton Hall, opened in 1965, is SPU's largest residence hall with more than 400 students on 6 floors. It was named in honor of Philip F. Ashton, PhD, a psychology professor (1929–1971). The hall is located on the highest point of SPU's campus. Many rooms have views of the campus and the Lake Washington Ship Canal. Annual Ashton Pop events include the Ashton Cup lip-sync contest, the Ashton Art Show, and a formal ball. In previous years the ball has been held at the Space Needle, on an Argosy Cruise, and at Seattle's W Hotel. Ashton Hall is also former home to the Orangemen of 6th West (6w), a notable floor on campus, who display their school spirit by attending men's basketball home games and some away games, leading cheers for the Falcons and occasionally against the referees and the other team.

Emerson Hall, opened in 2001, is the campus's second newest residence hall, featuring suite-style single, double, and triple rooms, card-access security, a main lounge with gas fireplace and Northwest wood beams, and an exercise center. Emerson also has a "Bridges Program", which lets students participate in intentional programs and conversations related to global issues and cross-cultural relationships. Emerson events include a quarterly Coffee House, the Emerson Film Festival, and the Spring Banquet. The hall is named for the street on which it resides.

Hill Hall, which opened in 1962, located in the upper middle of the campus just steps from Gwinn Commons and the SPU Library, is known as the "family" hall for its comfortable atmosphere. It features a newly updated main lounge, the REX athletic center,  and the Hill Hall "beach", a grassy area behind the hall popular for outdoor recreation and sunbathing. Hill Hall events include "Decade" Skate (a song-based skit competition), a retreat to Camp Casey, an annual ball, and 6th Hill "Beach Bash." It is named for the Reuben Hill family who donated property to the school for its expansion.

Moyer Hall, opened in 1953 and remodeled in 1983, is located in the center of the campus on the edge of Tiffany Loop. The smallest of the traditional residence halls, Moyer was named in honor of Jacob Moyer, PhD, professor of chemistry and dean (1925–46). The hall's annual events include a fall retreat, an ice-broomball game, a citywide scavenger hunt, and an all-hall banquet.  In the past, the ice-broomball game was played between residents of Moyer and Marston Hall (no longer used for housing).  This annual "Toilet Bowl" match featured as its trophy a urinal removed from Moyer during the 1983 remodel, which the losing hall was required to display prominently the year following their loss.  The 05–06 school year also introduced a new event called The Experience Moyer Project (EMP), which featured musical talent from the hall as well as a variety of other activities.

The university owns multiple additional residences including Bailey, Cremona, 37 West Dravus, Falcon, Wesley and other buildings known by address rather than name are owned and maintained by SPU. These apartments are closer to campus but provide a more independent-living situation. They provide a great aggregate living environment among students. The 35 and 34 West Cremona apartments were remodeled in 2008–09 and 2009–10, respectively, and the Wesley Apartments at Cremona and Dravus, as of the 2011–2012 academic year, are now owned and operated by SPU and include the offices of two of the Residence Life Coordinators. The school sold the Robbins apartments in 2012.

Athletics

The university's athletic teams participate in the Great Northwest Athletic Conference at the Division II level of the NCAA.

Men's varsity athletics
 Basketball
 Cross country
 Soccer
 Track & field

Women's varsity athletics
 Basketball
 Cross country
 Rowing
 Soccer
 Track & field
 Volleyball

Notable alumni

 Brian Fennell '06, singer/songwriter in SYML and Barcelona
 Timothy Beal '86, Florence Harkness Professor of Religion at Case Western Reserve University, author
 Ken Bone '82, former basketball coach at Washington State University
 Jim Cornelison '86, national anthem singer for Chicago Blackhawks
 Jake DeShazer, Doolittle raider, missionary to Japan
 Gordon Fee, distinguished professor of New Testament, biblical scholar, textual critic
 Andrew Foster '56, pioneer of deaf education in Africa, receiving the SPU 1982 alumni Medallion Award in recognition of this work 
 Robert A. Funk, founder, CEO, and Chairman of the Board of Express Employment Professionals, an employment agency company headquartered in Oklahoma City
 Gaylord T. Gunhus '62 20th Chief of Chaplains of the United States Army
 Marcus Hahnemann '93, former goalkeeper for United States Men's National Soccer Team and retired goalkeeper for Seattle Sounders F.C. 2012–2014
 Doris Brown Heritage '64, five-time world cross-country champion, coach, USA Track and Field Hall of Fame
 Joseph Kearney, former athletic director at the University of Washington, Michigan State University and WAC Commissioner
Ali bin Ahmed Al Kuwari, Qatari Minister of Finance
 William L. Lane, New Testament theologian and professor of biblical studies
 Gayle Moran, jazz vocalist, keyboardist and composer
 Rodger Nishioka, Christian educator and professor of Christian education
 Nikkita Oliver, lawyer, non-profit administrator, educator, poet, and politician.
 Eugene H. Peterson '54, author of The Message
 Dan Price '08, CEO of Gravity Payments
 Jeff Probst, host of Survivor television show
 Daniel Sandrin '03, Korean Basketball League player
 Jean Stothert, mayor of Omaha, Nebraska
 Jason Thornberry, writer
 Larry Wall '76, programmer, linguist, author, creator of the Perl programming language
 David T. Wong '61, co-inventor of Prozac
 Phil Zevenbergen, retired National Basketball Association player
 Conrad Lee, mayor of Bellevue, Washington
 Chad Forcier, assistant coach for the Milwaukee Bucks
 Jason Farrell, former U.S. soccer midfielder who spent four seasons in Major League Soccer
 Esther Snyder, businesswoman, co-founder of In-N-Out Burger

References

External links

 Official website
 Student newspaper

 
Educational institutions established in 1891
Liberal arts colleges in Washington (state)
Universities and colleges in Seattle
Universities and colleges in the United States affiliated with the Free Methodist Church
Universities and colleges accredited by the Northwest Commission on Colleges and Universities
Private universities and colleges in Washington (state)
Evangelicalism in Washington (state)
1891 establishments in Washington (state)
Council for Christian Colleges and Universities
Queen Anne, Seattle